The Thai Japanese Association School ( Tai-hi Kyōkai Gakkō or the バンコク日本人学 Bankoku Nihonjin Gakkō meaning "Bangkok Japanese School") is a Japanese school located in Huai Khwang District, Bangkok on Rama 9 Road. It is sponsored by the Thai-Japanese Association. It is the school with the largest campus in Bangkok, and one of the two Japanese schools in Bangkok.  It allows students from junior school Grade 1 (equivalent to the U.S. 1st grade) students to middle school Grade 3 (equivalent to the U.S. 9th grade) students to learn. The school only allows students with a Japanese nationality to study.

At one time the Japanese school, previously in the central city, moved to a suburban area. This caused a reduction in the Japanese children's interactions with Thai society because the children began to spend a large amount of time on school buses.

It is affiliated with the Thai-Japanese Association School Sriracha in Si Racha.

Student body
As of April 2018 the school has a total of  2,631 students and 229 teachers at the Bangkok campus, and 456 students at the Siracha campus.

See also

 Japanese migration to Thailand
 Josuikan Bangkok International School

References

Further reading

Online access:
 Ozawa, Michimasa (小澤 至賢 Ozawa Michimasa; 国立特殊教育総合研究所教育相談部). "クアラルンプール日本人学校,シンガポール日本人学校チャンギ校及び中学部,バンコク日本人学校における特別支援教育の実情と教育相談支援" (Archive). 世界の特殊教育 21, 51-55, 2007-03. National Institute of Special Needs Education (独立行政法人国立特別支援教育総合研究所). See profile at CiNii.

No online access:
 Nakajima, Hiroki (中島 博紀 Nakajima Hiroki; 前バンコク日本人学校教諭・佐賀県鹿島市立明倫小学校教諭). "バンコク日本人学校と国際理解教育について." 在外教育施設における指導実践記録 22, 27-30, 1999. Tokyo Gakugei University. See profile at CiNii.
 Shiozaki, Kanehito (塩崎 兼人 Shiozaki Kanehito; 前バンコク日本人学校教諭・大阪府海貝塚市立二色小学校教諭). "バンコク日本人学校における障害児教育実践報告 : 海外に散在する日本人学校の障害児教育の課題と展望について." 在外教育施設における指導実践記録 22, 101-104, 1999. Tokyo Gakugei University. See profile at CiNii.
 "バンコク日本人学校篇 (特集 花も実もある園芸生活)." クルンテ-プ 19([517]), 4-7, 2011-02. タイ国日本人会. See profile at CiNii.
 "学校だより バンコク日本人学校から着任のご挨拶." クルンテ-プ 19(521), 20-25, 2011-06. タイ国日本人会. See profile at CiNii.
 "学校だより バンコク日本人学校から着任のご挨拶." クルンテープ 20(533), 18-22, 2012-06. タイ国日本人会. See profile at CiNii.
 "学校だより バンコク日本人学校から 着任のご挨拶." クルンテープ 21(545), 18-25, 2013-06. タイ国日本人会. See profile at CiNii.
 "学校だより バンコク日本人学校から 着任のご挨拶." クルンテープ 22(557), 25-33, 2014-06. タイ国日本人会. See profile at CiNii.
 "特集 バンコク日本人学校から着任のご挨拶." クルンテ-プ 18(509), 14-20, 2010-06. タイ国日本人会. See profile at CiNii.
 泰日協会学校理事会. "2009年4月、待望のシラチャ日本人学校が開校します--バンコク日本人学校の姉妹校として、泰日協会学校理事会が一体経営します." バンコク日本人商工会議所所報 (554), 17-22, 2008-06. 盤谷日本人商工会議所. See profile at CiNii.
 原 恒夫. "バンコク日本人学校の進路指導を担当して (海外子女教育<特集>)." The Monthly Journal of Mombusho (文部時報) (1196), p33-36, 1977-01. ぎょうせい. See profile at CiNii.
 サウェ-ンサック タヌ- [著] 山本 順二 [訳]. "タイから見たバンコク日本人学校 (海外子女教育の課題--進展する国際化の中で<特集>) ." The Monthly Journal of Mombusho (文部時報) (1305), p27-30, 1986-01. ぎょうせい. See profile at CiNii.
 玉垣 洋一. "タイの日本人学校について." バンコク日本人商工会議所所報 (627), 15-19, 2014-07. 盤谷日本人商工会議所. See profile at CiNii.

External links
  Thai-Japanese Association School
 "Thai-Japanese Association School." - Thai-Japanese Association
  "Thai-Japanese Association School." - Thai-Japanese Association
 Thai-Japanese Association School (Archive)

1956 establishments in Thailand
Educational institutions established in 1956
Huai Khwang district
International schools in Bangkok
Japanese international schools in Thailand
Bangkok